Viktor Melin (18 April 1891 – 24 September 1973) was a Swedish wrestler. He competed in the middleweight event at the 1912 Summer Olympics.

References

External links
 

1891 births
1973 deaths
Olympic wrestlers of Sweden
Wrestlers at the 1912 Summer Olympics
Swedish male sport wrestlers
People from Kristianstad Municipality
Sportspeople from Skåne County